The original cast recording of The King and I was issued in 1951 on Decca Records, with Gertrude Lawrence, Yul Brynner, Dorothy Sarnoff and Doretta Morrow. The Broadway cast recording was directed by John Van Druten, with orchestrations by Robert Russell Bennett and musical director Frederick Dvonch. The recording was inducted into the Grammy Hall of Fame in 2001.

A studio recording of selections sung by Patrice Munsel, Robert Merrill and Dinah Shore followed, later in 1951, and the London cast recording album followed two years later.

Track listing
Overture	
"I Whistle A Happy Tune";	Gertrude Lawrence  	
"My Lord And Master"; Doretta Morrow  	
"Hello Young Lovers";	Gertrude Lawrence	
"March Of The Siamese Children";	orchestra	
"A Puzzlement";	Yul Brynner 	
"Getting to Know You"; Gertrude Lawrence with chorus 
"We Kiss In A Shadow";	Doretta Morrow and Larry Douglas  	
"Shall I Tell You What I Think Of You?";	Gertrude Lawrence  	
"Something Wonderful";	Dorothy Sarnoff  
"I Have Dreamed";	Doretta Morrow and Larry Douglas   	
"Shall We Dance?"; Gertrude Lawrence and Yul Brynner

References

1951 albums
Cast recordings
The King and I